The 2019 Keurgeuz Premier Ligaseu or 2019 Kyrgyz Premier League was the 28th season of the Kyrgyz Premier League, Kyrgyzstan's top division of association football organized by the Football Federation of Kyrgyz Republic. The season started on 6 April 2019, with eight teams participating.

Starting from the 2019 season, the league was rebranded as the Kyrgyz Premier League.

Teams

''Note: Table lists in alphabetical order.

League table

Results

Matches 1-14

Matches 15-28

Top scorers

References

External links

Kyrgyzstan League seasons
1
Kyrgyzstan